Nithiwat Tharatorn is a Thai film director. He made his directorial debut alongside five other directors on the 2003 childhood romantic comedy Fan Chan (2003) and his solo debut with the romantic comedy Seasons Change in 2006. and now, he have romantic drama film Teacher's Diary in 2014.

Selected filmography
 Fan Chan (2003)
 Seasons Change (2006)
 Dear Galileo (2009)
 Teacher's Diary (2014)
 A Gift (segment: "Still on My Mind") (2016)

External links
 

Nithiwat Tharathorn
Nithiwat Tharathorn
Nithiwat Tharathorn
Living people
Nithiwat Tharathorn
Year of birth missing (living people)